The Sako 75 is a bolt-action rifle produced by the Finnish manufacturer Sako from 1996 until it was replaced by its successor, the Sako 85 in 2006, and finally discontinued in 2007.

History 
The Sako 75 was named after the 75 year anniversary of Sako in 1996, when the first Sako 75 was made. The Model 75 was externally very similar to earlier Sako models, but its construction was different, having 3 symmetrical locking lugs, a manual ejector, and a detachable magazine. Hitherto, only one Sako rifle, the L46, had a detachable magazine.

Models 
The rifle was marketed as Sako's premium model for hunting, and was delivered in many different configurations and chamberings. Examples of some Sako 75 models are:
 Hunter
 Hunter Stainless
 Hunter left hand
 Laminated stainless
 Deluxe
 Synthetic stainless
 Finnlight
 Varmint
 Varmint Laminated Stainless

Technical 
The trigger pull weight is adjustable between 1-2 kg. The action can be cycled with the safety applied. The scope sight in the receiver bridge is a proprietary tapered dovetail rail with variable width (narrow at the rear, wide at the front). Proprietary scope rings are available, and aftermarket picatinny rail adapters are also available. The entirety of the bolt, including its handle, is milled from a single piece of cast steel.

The Sako 75 has a push feed mechanism, compared to its successor Sako 85 which has controlled feeding. The M75 and M85 also have different types of magazines.

Receiver lengths 
The receiver was delivered in 6 different lengths depending on the cartridge group, graded with roman numerals from I to V:
I (Short)
 .222 Rem
 .223 Rem

II (PPC)
 .22 PPC USA
 6 mm PPC USA

III (Medium)
 .22-250
 .243 Win
 .260 Rem
 7 mm-08 Rem
 .308 Win

SM (Short magnum)
 .270 WSM
 .300 WSM

IV (Long)
 .25-06
 6.5×55 mm
 .270 Win
 7×64 mm
 .30-06
 9.3×62 mm
 9.3×66 mm

V (Magnum)
 7 mm Rem Mag
 .300 Win Mag
 .375 H&H
 .416 Rem Mag

See also 
 Sako TRG
 Tikka T3
 Sako 85
 Sako S20

References

External links 
 Official Sako product website

Bolt-action rifles of Finland
Hunting rifles
Weapons and ammunition introduced in 2006